Commissioner Andrew Dudley Roe is a former British Army officer and firefighter currently serving as the Commissioner of the London Fire Brigade.

Early life and education 
Andy Roe grew up in London and graduated from Newcastle University in 1995 with a Bachelor of Arts in English literature.

Career 
In 1997, Roe was commissioned from the Royal Military Academy Sandhurst and joined the 12th Regiment Royal Artillery as a second lieutenant. During his time as an officer, he served as a troop commander and a battery captain and served two tours in Northern Ireland. During his time in Northern Ireland, he was wounded when a pipe bomb was thrown at him, which also severely injured an RUC officer stood next to Roe. The officer died after spending four weeks on a life support machine. As a captain, he transferred his commission to the Army reserve in April 2000.

In 2002, Roe joined the London Fire Brigade as a firefighter and in January 2017 was appointed as Assistant Commissioner.

During the Grenfell Tower fire, Roe was appointed incident commander where he revoked the controversial 'stay put' advice to the residents. As the first commissioner appointed since the fire, Roe issued a plea to the residents of London's 7000 high rise blocks to set aside any 'post-Grenfell doubts continue to follow firefighters’ advice in the event of a blaze.'

On 28 January 2020, Roe became the first LFB commissioner to sign the Armed Forces Covenant with the British Armed Forces.

Awards and honours

See also
 London Fire Brigade
 Chief Fire Officer
 London Fire and Emergency Planning Authority
 Chief Fire Officers Association

References 

London Fire Brigade personnel
Graduates of the Royal Military Academy Sandhurst
Year of birth missing (living people)
Living people